The European White Elm cultivar Ulmus laevis 'Pendula' is a little-known cultivar of disputed taxonomy.

Description
A weeping tree, but with very corky winged branchlets, leading some authorities to consider the tree to be U. minor 'Propendens'.

Cultivation
Only one specimen is known to survive in cultivation, at the ELTE Botanical Garden in 
Budapest, Hungary.

Accessions

Europe
 Botanic Garden of Eötvös Loránd University of Sciences (ELTE Botanical Garden), Budapest, Hungary. Acc. no. 19980719

References

European white elm cultivar
Ulmus
Ulmus articles missing images